The canton of Saint-Dié-des-Vosges-1 is an administrative division of the Vosges department, in northeastern France. It was created at the French canton reorganisation which came into effect in March 2015. Its seat is in Saint-Dié-des-Vosges.

It consists of the following communes:

 Autrey 
 La Bourgonce
 Housseras
 Jeanménil
 Rambervillers
 Saint-Dié-des-Vosges (partly)
 Saint-Gorgon
 Saint-Michel-sur-Meurthe
 La Salle
 Taintrux
 La Voivre

References

Cantons of Vosges (department)